Seyed Majid Hosseini (born 20 June 1996) is an Iranian professional footballer who plays as a defender for a French club Lens and Iran national team.

Hosseini made his full international debut in 2018 and represented Iran at the 2018 FIFA World Cup and 2019 AFC Asian Cup.

Club career

Esteghlal
Hosseini joined the first team of Esteghlal in 2014 and made his first appearance for the club on 17 April 2015 as an 18-year-old. He spent a year on loan at Rah Ahan, before returning to Esteghlal and earning a spot in the first eleven. Hosseini was named to the Persian Gulf Pro League team of the season for 2017–18.

Trabzonspor
On 30 July 2018, Hosseini officially Süper Lig side Trabzonspor on a three-year contract joining his compatriot Vahid Amiri. He was given the number 5 shirt, the same number he wore in Esteghlal the previous season.

International career

Hosseini made his international debut against Uzbekistan on 19 May 2018. In June 2018, he was named in Iran's squad for the 2018 World Cup in Russia. After teammate Rouzbeh Cheshmi was injured in training, Hosseini started as centre back in Iran's two remaining group stage matches, playing every minute in the team's 0–1 loss to Spain and 1–1 draw with Portugal. While playing against England in the 2022 FIFA World Cup, Hosseini collided with teammate Alireza Beiranvand breaking Beiranvand's nose. England won the game 6-2.

Career statistics

Club

International

Honours

Club

Esteghlal
Hazfi Cup (1): 2017–18

Trabzonspor
Turkish Cup (1): 2019–20
Turkish Super Cup (1): 2020

Individual
Persian Gulf Pro League Team of the Year (1): 2017–18

References

External links

1996 births
Living people
People from Tehran
Iranian footballers
Esteghlal F.C. players
Rah Ahan players
Trabzonspor footballers
Kayserispor footballers
Persian Gulf Pro League players
Süper Lig players
Iran under-20 international footballers
Association football defenders
2018 FIFA World Cup players
Iran international footballers
Iranian expatriate footballers
Expatriate footballers in Turkey
Iranian expatriate sportspeople in Turkey
2019 AFC Asian Cup players
2022 FIFA World Cup players